Christopher Jones (born July 17, 1982) is a former American football wide receiver. He was originally an undrafted free agent signed by the Minnesota Vikings after the 2005 NFL Draft. He was on the Seahawks' roster in 2006, but did not see any playing time. He was released by the Seahawks on August 28, 2007.

He signed a contract with the Saskatchewan Roughriders on September 24, 2008 and was placed on their Developmental Squad.

Jones graduated from Jackson State University in Jackson, Mississippi, where he was an outstanding wide receiver for the Tigers. While at Jackson State, Jones qualified for the Olympic fencing team, but did not participate due to his commitments to Tiger football.

External links
 Just Sports Stats

1982 births
Living people
People from Macon, Mississippi
American football wide receivers
Canadian football wide receivers
Jackson State Tigers football players
Minnesota Vikings players
Seattle Seahawks players
Saskatchewan Roughriders players
Kansas City Brigade players